The Collegium Maius (Latin for "Great College") located in Kraków Old Town, Poland, is the Jagiellonian University's oldest building, dating back to the 14th century. It stands at the corner of ulica Jagiellońska (Jagiellon Street) and ulica Świętej  Anny (St. Anne Street) near the Main Square of the historic city centre. Collegium Maius is the location of the Jagiellonian University Museum, a registered museum established on the initiative of Prof. Karol Estreicher after meticulous restorations which lasted from 1949 through 1964, bringing the edifice back to its original look from before 1840.

History 
The then 36-year-old first university in Poland, known at the time as Akademia krakowska, moved into the building some time in the 14th century after King Władysław II Jagiełło had purchased it as an educational grant with funds bequeathed by his late wife, Queen Jadwiga.  

The Collegium Maius was rebuilt in the late 15th century as a late-Gothic structure surrounding a large courtyard bordered with arcades. In 1517 a well was built in the center of the courtyard. Professors lived and worked upstairs, while lectures were held downstairs. 

In the 1490s the Collegium Maius counted among its students Nicolaus Copernicus, the Renaissance astronomer and polymath who would revolutionize European ideas about the universe.

Cultural significance 
The Collegium Maius Museum features lecture rooms, communal halls, professors’ quarters, a library and a treasury containing rectors' Gothic maces and the Jagiellonian globe. Exhibits also include medieval scientific instruments, globes, paintings, collectibles, furniture, coins and medals.

Jagiellonian University Museum Directors 
 Karol Estreicher (1951–1976)
 Stanisław Waltoś (1977–2011)
 Krzysztof Stopka (since 2012)

See also 
 Culture of Kraków

References 

About Collegium Maius at www.krakow-info.com
Collegium Maius Museum at www3.uj.edu.pl

Jagiellonian University buildings
Gothic architecture in Poland